Shirshasana (Sanskrit: शीर्षासन, IAST: śīrṣāsana) Salamba Shirshasana, or Yoga Headstand is an inverted asana in modern yoga as exercise; it was described as both an asana and a mudra in classical hatha yoga, under different names. It has been called the king of all asanas. Its many variations can be combined into Mandalasana, in which the legs are progressively swept from one variation to the next in a full circle around the body.

Etymology and origins

The name Salamba Shirshasana comes from the Sanskrit words सालम्ब Sālamba meaning "supported", शीर्ष, Śīrṣa meaning "head", and आसन, Āsana meaning "posture" or "seat".

The name Śīrṣāsana is relatively recent; the pose itself is much older, but had other names and purposes. Like other inversions, it was practised as Viparita Karani, described as a mudra in the 15th century Hatha Yoga Pradipika and other classical texts on haṭha yoga. Viparita Karani, "the Inverter", holds the head down and the feet up for hours at a time, so as to cause gravity to retain the prana. The practice is claimed by the Dattatreya Yoga Shastra to destroy all diseases. to increase the digestive fire, and to banish signs of ageing. The pose is described and illustrated in halftone as Viparita Karani in the 1905 Yogasopana purvacatusca.

Hemacandra's 11th century Yogaśāstra names it Duryodhanāsana ("Duryodhana's pose") or Kapālīkarana ("head technique"), while the 18th century Joga Pradīpikā calls it Kapālī āsana, head posture; it is number 17 of the set of 84 asanas described and illustrated there. However, the 19th century Sritattvanidhi uses the name Śīrṣāsana as well as Kapālāsana, while the Malla Purana, a 13th-century manual for wrestlers, names but does not describe 18 asanas including Śīrṣāsana.

Description

In the Supported Headstand (Salamba Shirshasana), the body is completely inverted, and held upright supported by the forearms and the crown of the head. In his Light on Yoga, B. K. S. Iyengar uses a forearm support, with the fingers interlocked around the head, for the basic posture Shirshasana I and its variations; he demonstrates a Western-style tripod headstand, the palms of the hands on the ground with raised elbows, for Shirshasana II and III; and other supports for further variants. Iyengar names and illustrates ten variants in all, as well as several preparatory and transitional poses.

The yoga headstand is nicknamed "king" of all the asanas.
A variety of other asanas can be used to build the required upper body strength and balance.

Shirshasana, alongside Sarvangasana and Padmasana, is one of the asanas most often reported as the cause of an injury.

Variations

Shirshasana permits many variations, including:

Mandalasana, Circle pose, is not a single variation but a sequence of movements in Shirshasana in which the legs move in a full circle around the body from one of these headstand variations to the next.

See also
 List of asanas

Notes

References

Further reading

External links 

 Step by Step Instruction

 

Inverted asanas
Articles containing video clips
Medieval Hatha Yoga asanas

ru:Перевёрнутые асаны#Ширшасана